The 1923–24 Newark F.C. season was the third season for the club in the American Soccer League but its first season in Newark after playing the previous season as Harrison S.C. Following the 1922–23 season, the team moved from Harrison, New Jersey to Newark. The club finished the season in 8th place.

American Soccer League

Pld = Matches played; W = Matches won; D = Matches drawn; L = Matches lost; GF = Goals for; GA = Goals against; Pts = Points

National Challenge Cup

American Football Association Cup

Notes and references
Bibliography

Footnotes

Newark F.C.
American Soccer League (1921–1933) seasons
Newark F.C.